Largus Theodora Angenent (born 1969) is an American environmental biotechnologist. He is a Humboldt Professorship in applied microbiology at the University of Tübingen, Germany's largest monetary international research prize.

Early life and education
Angenent was born in 1969. He completed his Bachelor of Science degree and Master's degree from Wageningen University and Research in the Netherlands. Following this, he traveled to the United States and enrolled at Iowa State University for his doctorate degree.

Career
Upon completing his post-doctoral research at the University of Colorado, Boulder, Angenent accepted an assistant professor position at Washington University in St. Louis. After his wife, microbial ecologist Ruth E. Ley, joined him in the city they conducted a dual career job search before settling on Cornell University. As an associate professor of biological and environmental engineering, Angenent and his laboratory researchers began harnessing microbes to produce liquid fuel from the gases produced by slow pyrolysis. A few years later, he was the recipient of a State University of New York Chancellor's Awards for Excellence in Professional Service for 2015.

In 2016, Angenent was appointed a Humboldt Professorship in applied microbiology at the University of Tübingen, Germany's largest monetary international research prize. In his first academic year in this role, Angenent sought to recycle waste with the ultimate aim of creating a sustainable cycle of materials. He developed a bioprocess that enables the conversion of acid whey without the use of additional chemicals. During the COVID-19 pandemic, Angenent began investigating how proteins can be produced without the need for animal husbandry or crop cultivation.

References

External links

Living people
1969 births
Academic journal editors
Academic staff of the University of Tübingen
Cornell University faculty
Iowa State University alumni
Wageningen University and Research alumni